WRON is a News/Talk formatted broadcast radio station licensed to Ronceverte, West Virginia, serving Ronceverte and Lewisburg in West Virginia. WRON is owned and operated by Radio Greenbrier, LLC.

History
WRON began broadcasting May 5, 1947, as a Mutual affiliate on 1400 kHz with 250 watts of power. The station was started by Bill Blake, who returned to Ronceverte after serving in World War II.

References

External links
 Radio Greenbrier's Website

1947 establishments in West Virginia
News and talk radio stations in the United States
Radio stations established in 1947
RON (AM)